Ben Richards or Benjamin Richards may refer to:

 Ben Richards (actor) (born 1972), British stage and television actor
 Ben Richards (writer) (born 1964), British author and screenwriter
 Benjamin Wood Richards (1797–1851), American lawyer
 Ben Richards, the main character in The Running Man
 Ben Richards, the main character in The Immortal

See also 
 Franklin Benjamin Richards, fictional character in the Fantastic Four
 François-Marie-Benjamin Richard (1819–1908), archbishop of Paris
 Richard Benjamin (born 1938), American actor and director